Bombus neoboreus, the active bumble bee, is a species of bumblebee. It is native to Canada, its distribution extending west into Alaska. It is an arctic species.

References

Bumblebees
Insects described in 1919
Insects of Canada
Fauna of Alaska